Wéris is a village of Wallonia and district of the municipality of Durbuy, located in the province of Luxembourg, Belgium. 

The village of Oppagne is part of Wéris. Till 1977 Wéris was a municipality.

The village is a member of the organisation Les Plus Beaux Villages de Wallonie.

Wéris megaliths

It is well known for its megaliths, including dolmens and menhirs. There is a "Museum of Megaliths" in the centre of the village. There is a three-mile alignment of standing stones and chambered tombs that include the Dolmen de Wéris and the Dolmen d'Oppagne, as well as the Menhir Danthine, the three Menhirs d'Oppagne, and the Menhirs of Morville, Tour and Ozo. Other famous stones in the area include La Pierre Haina, the Lit du Diable (Devil's bed) and the Pas Bayard capstone, about which there are legends.

References

External links

Sub-municipalities of Durbuy
Former municipalities of Luxembourg (Belgium)